Abyssocladia is a genus of the family Cladorhizidae, a family of carnivorous sponges. It is made up of at least 39 species found in oceans all over the world.

Description
This genus is characterized by its unique teeth-like structures called abyssochelae, although they are not present in every species. Types of microscleres could also include cleistochelae, arcute chelae, and/or sigmacistras. Their general morphology can be divided into two groups. The first group has a long peduncle and round top. The second group is feather-like with a shorter peduncle. Both groups have straight spicules and are covered in a layer of soft tissue with sticky microstrongyles protruding perpendicularly from the body, used to capture prey. Sizes of these organisms can vary from a few millimeters to several centimeters tall and just a few millimeters wide. Their thin skeleton and soft tissue can make these sponges very fragile.

Feeding 
Most carnivorous sponges lack an aquiferous system, meaning they cannot filter water to get their food. Instead, they have hook-like microscleres to capture prey, like small crustaceans. These structures entangle prey and amoebocytes in the sponge surround the prey, bringing it inside to be consumed. Digestion of its prey can take up to several days. This unusual process of feeding was likely adapted because it is easier for the organism to get more nutrients in one meal as compared to filter feeding in the deep sea.

Distribution 
In the deep sea, resources are sparse, so organisms tend to have clustered distribution. These carnivorous sponges are usually found around nutrient hot spots like seamounts, and oceanic ridges. While most species in abyssocladia have been found at depths over 3000 meters, a few have been found in shallower waters around 1000m. One species, A. antarctica, was found at 220 m, in the Weddel Sea off the coast of Antarctica. In addition to the Weddel Sea, Abyssocladia have been found in many ocean basins all over the world, including the Pacific, Atlantic, and Indian oceans.

Species 
About 39 species are currently recognized:

 Abyssocladia annae Ekins, Erpenbeck & Hooper, 2020
 Abyssocladia antarctica Buskowiak & Janussen, 2021
 Abyssocladia atlantica Lopes & Hajdu, 2014
 Abyssocladia boletiphora Hestetun, Rapp & Xavier, 2017
 Abyssocladia bruuni Lévi, 1964
 Abyssocladia carcharias Kelly & Vacelet, 2011
 Abyssocladia claviformis Koltun, 1970
 Abyssocladia corniculiphora Hestetun, Rapp & Xavier, 2017
 Abyssocladia desmophora Hooper & Lévi, 1989
 Abyssocladia diegoramirezensis Lopes, Bravo & Hajdu, 2011
 Abyssocladia dominalba Vacelet, 2006
 Abyssocladia escheri Ekins, Erpenbeck & Hooper, 2020
 Abyssocladia faranauti Hestetun, Fourt, Vacelet, Boury-Esnault & Rapp, 2015
 Abyssocladia flagrum Lehnert, Stone & Heimler, 2006
 Abyssocladia fryerae Hestetun, Rapp & Pomponi, 2019
 Abyssocladia gliscofila Ekins, Erpenbeck & Hooper, 2020
 Abyssocladia hemiradiata Hestetun, Rapp & Xavier, 2017
 Abyssocladia huitzilopochtli Vacelet, 2006
 Abyssocladia inflata Vacelet, 2006
 Abyssocladia kanaconi Vacelet, 2020
 Abyssocladia kellyae Hestetun, Rapp & Pomponi, 2019
 Abyssocladia koltuni Ereskovsky & Willenz, 2007
 Abyssocladia lakwollii Vacelet & Kelly, 2014
 Abyssocladia leverhulmei Goodwin, Berman, Downey & Hendry, 2017
 Abyssocladia marianensis Hestetun, Rapp & Pomponi, 2019
 Abyssocladia microstrongylata Vacelet, 2020
 Abyssocladia mucronata Vacelet, 2020
 Abyssocladia myojinensis Ise & Vacelet, 2010
 Abyssocladia natsushimae Ise & Vacelet, 2010
 Abyssocladia naudur Vacelet, 2006
 Abyssocladia oxeata Koltun, 1970
 Abyssocladia oxyasters Ekins, Erpenbeck, Goudie & Hooper, 2020
 Abyssocladia polycephalus Hestetun, Pomponi & Rapp, 2016
 Abyssocladia stegosaurensis Hestetun, Rapp & Pomponi, 2019
 Abyssocladia symmetrica Ridley & Dendy, 1886
 Abyssocladia tecta Hestetun, Fourt, Vacelet, Boury-Esnault & Rapp, 2015
 Abyssocladia umbellata Lopes, Bravo & Hajdu, 2011
 Abyssocladia vaceleti Ríos & Cristobo, 2018
 Abyssocladia villosa Hestetun, Rapp & Pomponi, 2019

References 

Wikipedia Student Program
Cladorhizidae
Sponge genera